North Pitcher is a hamlet in Chenango County, New York, United States. North Pitcher has a post office with ZIP code 13124, which opened on March 16, 1824.

References

Hamlets in Chenango County, New York
Hamlets in New York (state)